WRMM-FM (101.3 FM) is a radio station licensed to serve Rochester, New York, United States. The station is owned by Stephens Media Group.  Its studios are located at the First Federal Plaza building in downtown Rochester, and its transmitter site is in Rochester's west side.

WRMM broadcasts an adult contemporary music format and during November and December broadcasts Christmas music.

History
Historically, the station was the sister station to AM 680/990, now WDCX. Then-WRNY signed on an FM signal at 97.7 in the early 1950s but shut it down in 1955. Twelve years later, the same station, now known as WNYR, signed a new FM signal at its current location, at which it has broadcast ever since. Prior to 1988, WRMM was known as WEZO and had an Easy Listening (Bonneville) format. AM 990 and WRMM were separated in 1996; WRMM was sold to CBS Radio and AM 990 to a religious broadcaster.

Entercom Communications acquired the station from CBS Radio on November 30, 2007. However, because Entercom's acquisition of CBS's Rochester radio cluster exceeded the Federal Communications Commission's single-market limit on radio station ownership, Entercom put WRMM, along with WZNE and WFKL, back on the market. As of May 2008, Stephens Media Group took over ownership of WRMM.

References

External links
Official Website

RMM-FM
Radio stations established in 1966
1966 establishments in New York (state)
Mainstream adult contemporary radio stations in the United States